Minuscule 155 (in the Gregory-Aland numbering), ε 403 (Soden), is a Greek minuscule manuscript of the New Testament, on parchment. Palaeographically it has been assigned to the 13th century. It has marginalia.

Description 

The codex contains a complete text of the four Gospels on 307 parchment leaves (size ). The text is written in one column per page, in 20 lines per page.

There is also a division according to the smaller Ammonian Sections (in Mark 241 – 16:20), but it was added by later hand.

Some lessons from Paul prefixed.

Text 
The Greek text of the codex is a representative of the Byzantine text-type. Hermann von Soden classified it to the textual family Kr. Aland placed it in Category. According to the Claremont Profile Method it belongs to the textual family Kr in Luke 1 and Luke 20. In Luke 20 no profile was made.

History 

As of the 2010s, the manuscript was dated by the INTF to the 13th century.

It was given by Andreas Rivetus to Rutgersius (1589-1625), Swedish Ambassador to the United Provinces. It belonged to Daniel Heinsius and Nicholas Heinsius. It was cited by Daniel Heinsius, as Codex Rutgersii, in his Exercitationes sacrae in Evangel. (1639) After Nicholas Heinsius it belonged to Queen Christina of Sweden and Cardinal Pietro Ottoboni.

Heinsius, one of its owner, worked on the Textus Receptus of the Greek New Testament for Elzeviers edition (1624, 1633), than influence of the codex 155 on the Textus Receptus is possible. According to Jonge it is possible only in 12 places, but all of this changes can be explained by the influence of the Complutensian Polyglotte.

It was examined by Wettstein, Birch (about 1782), Scholz, C. R. Gregory (1886), Jonge. Wettstein designated it by number 99.

It is housed at the Vatican Library (Reg. gr. 79), at Rome.

See also 

 List of New Testament minuscules
 Biblical manuscript
 Textual criticism

References

Further reading 

 
 H. J. de Jonge, "The Manuscriptus Evangeliorum Antiquissimus of Daniel Hensius", NTS 21 (1974_1975), pp. 286–294.

Greek New Testament minuscules
13th-century biblical manuscripts
Manuscripts of the Vatican Library